Corisella is a genus of water boatmen in the family Corixidae. There are about 5 described species in Corisella.

Species
 Corisella decolor (Uhler, 1871)
 Corisella edulis (Champion, 1901)
 Corisella inscripta (Uhler, 1894)
 Corisella mercenaria (Say, 1832)
 Corisella tarsalis (Fieber, 1851)

References

Further reading

 
 
 

Corixini
Heteroptera genera